This is a list of programs broadcast by the now-defunct U.S. Spanish-language television network Azteca América.

Final programming

Telenovelas/series 
 A cada quien su santo
 Están entre nosotros
 Mujeres rompiendo el silencio
 Pobre Diabla
 Las Juanas
 Prófugas del destino

Talk/reality
 Cocinísima
 Dificil de Creer
 El objetivo del crimen
 El oscuro paseo de la fama
 Extranormal
 Entrañas de lo prohibido
 Escape perfecto
 Hablemos de cine
 La Isla
 Lo que la gente cuenta
 Mentes Retorcidas
 Miss Universo
 Relatos Misteriosos
 Todo un show
 Venga la Alegría
 Ventaneando

News 
 
Al Extremo
 Al Extremo en 30
 Al Extremo Fin de Semana
 Hechos
 Hechos AM
 Noticiero Hechos Local

Sports programming 
 Box Azteca
 Lucha Azteca
 Pasión Deportiva

Comedy
 Ya Cayo Renovado

Children's programming
 Super Libro

Former programming

Telenovelas/series

 11-11: En mi cuadra nada cuadra (May 19, 2014 – August 29, 2014)
 Amor en Custodia (2005 – 2006)
 Así en el barrio como en el cielo (July 3, 2017 – December 15, 2017)
 Azul Tequila (2006; 2009)
 Baila Reggaeton (2007)
 Bajo el alma (July 16, 2018 – September 21, 2018)
 Belinda (2004 – 2005)
 Bellezas Indomables (2008)
 Campeones de la vida (2007)
 Catalina y Sebastián (2008 – 2009)
 Cielo Rojo (2011-2012)
 Como en el cine (2004)
 Contrato de Amor (May 21, 2018 – August 17, 2018)
 Cuando seas mía (2006)
 Demasiado Corazón (2002)
 Dos Chicos de Cuidado en la Ciudad (2003 – 2004)
 El amor no es como lo pintan
 El beso del escorpión (March 6, 2017 – December 4, 2017)
 Emperatriz (2012 – 2012)
 Entre correr y vivir (January 15, 2018 – March 9, 2018)
 Grachi (February 4, 2014 – May 16, 2014)
 Hombre tenías que ser (April 2, 2018 – May 18, 2018)
 La Chacala (2005 – 2006)
 La Hija del Jardinero (2003)
 La Loba (2010)
 La Otra Cara del Alma (2013)
 La otra mitad del sol (2005)
 Las Juanas (2004-2005)
 Lo que callamos las mujeres
 Lo que es el amor (2002; 2004 – 2005)
 Marea Brava (2002 – 2003)
 Mientras haya vida (2008)
 Mirada de mujer (2006 – 2007)
 Montecristo (2007; 2011 – 2012)
 Mujer comprada (March 7, 2016 – September 16, 2016)
 Olvide que te quería (April 18, 2016 – August 19, 2016; June 26, 2017 – January 2018)
 Quiéreme tonto (2016)
 Los Sánchez (2005 – 2006)
 Se Busca Un Hombre (2007)
 Señora (2008 – 2009)
 Siempre tuya Acapulco (July 3, 2017 – January 5, 2018)
 Soñarás (2004 – 2005)
 Súbete a mi moto (2005)
 UEPA! Un escenario para amar (December 4, 2017 – March 30, 2018)
 Un día cualquiera (July 3, 2017 – August 25, 2017)
 Verdades Secretas (April 24, 2017 – June 30, 2017)
 Violetta (September 1, 2014 – December 19, 2014)
 Vis a vis (October 1, 2017 – 2018)

Comedy/variety programming
 Ahora caigo!
 Fábrica de Huevos
 Infarto
 Tunéame La Nave (2011)

Talk/reality shows 
 Asesinos seriales
 A quien corresponda
 Cosas de la Vida
 Desafio Marruecos
 El club de Eva (January 15, 2018 – May 4, 2018)
 El Hormiguero
 Enamorándonos (2017)
 Ella es Niurka (2011)
 La Academia
 Las Entradas de los Prohibido
 Las tardes con la Bigorra (2016 – February 13, 2017)
 Laura de Todos
 ¿Qué hay de comer?
 Tatiana (2012)
 Venga el Domingo

Sports programming
 Deporte Caliente
 Fútbol Méxicano Primera Divisíon
 Los Protagonistas

Children's programming
 Bucaneros
 Cybercuates
 Kenny the Shark (December 1, 2013 – June 1, 2014)
 Reino Animal
 Tutenstein (December 1, 2013 – June 1, 2014)

References

Azteca America
Azteca América